Cyprus participated in the Junior Eurovision Song Contest 2016 which took place on 20 November 2016, in Valletta, Malta. Cyprus Broadcasting Corporation (CyBC) was responsible for organising their entry for the contest. George Michaelides was internally selected to represent Cyprus with the song "Dance Floor". Cyprus placed 16th with 27 points.

Background

Before Junior Eurovision
The Cypriot broadcaster announced on 5 August 2016, that they would be making their return to the contest after a one-year absence. They selected their entry internally.

Artist and song information

George Michaelides
George Michaelides (born 26 August 2003) is a Cypriot singer and dancer who represented Cyprus in the Junior Eurovision Song Contest 2016 with his song "Dance Floor", which placed 16th with a total of 27 points.

Dance Floor
"Dance Floor" is a song by Cypriot singer George Michaelides. It represented Cyprus during the Junior Eurovision Song Contest 2016. The song is composed and written by Andreas Anastasiou and George Michaelides, and produced by Jonas Gladnikoff.

At Junior Eurovision
During the opening ceremony and the running order draw which took place on 14 November 2016, Cyprus was drawn to perform 16th on 20 November 2015, following the Netherlands and preceding Georgia.

Final
George Michaelides performed with four backup dancers, alternating between playing drums and dancing, amidst a backdrop of fire.

Voting
During the press conference for the Junior Eurovision Song Contest 2016, held in Stockholm, the Reference Group announced several changes to the voting format for the 2016 contest. Previously, points had been awarded based on a combination of 50% National juries and 50% televoting, with one more set of points also given out by a 'Kids' Jury'. For the first time since the inauguration of the contest the voting procedure will not include a public televote. Following these results, three expert jurors will also announce their points from 1–8, 10, and 12. These professional jurors are: Christer Björkman, Mads Grimstad, and Jedward.

References

Junior Eurovision Song Contest
Cyprus
2016